Mimulopsis elliotii is a flowering shrub from the family Acanthaceae and a species of the genus Mimulopsis. This flowering shrub is one of the species that can be found at Rwenzori Mountains.

References

Acanthaceae
Endemic flora of Uganda
Endemic flora of the Democratic Republic of the Congo
Rwenzori Mountains
Afromontane flora
Albertine Rift montane forests